Fernando Pérez Noriega (born 12 August 1956) is a Mexican politician from the National Action Party. He has served as Deputy of the LVI and LVIII Legislatures of the Mexican Congress representing the Federal District, as well as a local deputy in the Legislative Assembly of the Federal District.

References

1956 births
Living people
Politicians from Mexico City
National Action Party (Mexico) politicians
21st-century Mexican politicians
Deputies of the LVIII Legislature of Mexico
Members of the Chamber of Deputies (Mexico) for Mexico City
Members of the Congress of Mexico City
Escuela Libre de Derecho alumni
Columbia Law School alumni
20th-century Mexican politicians